Friends & Relatives is a compilation album released by Eagle Records and Purple Pyramid (US) in 1999.
The album features songs from various artists that have a common linkage to Electric Light Orchestra, such as The Move and Wizzard.

Track listing

Audio CD

References

Albums produced by Jeff Lynne
Albums produced by Roy Wood
Progressive rock compilation albums
1999 compilation albums